Olga Nasedkina (born 28 December 1982) is a retired Kazakhstani volleyball player. She competed in the women's tournament at the 2008 Summer Olympics. She was also part of the team that won bronze in the women's volleyball tournament at the 2010 Asian Games.

References

External links
 

1982 births
Living people
Kyrgyzstani women's volleyball players
Kazakhstani women's volleyball players
Olympic volleyball players of Kazakhstan
Volleyball players at the 2008 Summer Olympics
Kyrgyzstani emigrants to Kazakhstan
Sportspeople from Bishkek
Asian Games medalists in volleyball
Volleyball players at the 2002 Asian Games
Volleyball players at the 2006 Asian Games
Volleyball players at the 2010 Asian Games
Medalists at the 2010 Asian Games
Asian Games bronze medalists for Kazakhstan